The National Syndicalist Movement (Portuguese: Movimento Nacional-Sindicalista) was a political movement that briefly flourished in Portugal in the 1930s. Stanley G. Payne defines them as a fascist movement in his typography.

Development
The MNS emerged amongst a group of students who were associated with the Liga Nacional 28 de maio but had grown disillusioned with its right-wing economic platform. Under the leadership of Francisco Rolão Preto, the National Syndicalists emerged in 1932 from a tradition of Monarchism and Integralismo Lusitano ("Lusitanic Integralism") to offer a platform that they hoped would lead to full corporatism of association or unionism in opposition to capitalism and communism. They called for a totalitarian state to rule Portugal, although they placed central importance on the Catholic Church and made Catholic identity an important part of their appeal. They adopted the Order of Christ Cross as their emblem, in order to underline their Christian ethos, and set up their own armed militia that became known as the "Blueshirts" (Camisas azuis) because of the colour of their uniforms (inspired by Benito Mussolini's Blackshirts); they also greeted each other using the Roman salute. Their main inspiration was Italian fascism although they were also linked to the Spanish Falange, who shared many of their ideas. Nonetheless Rolão Preto clashed with José Antonio Primo de Rivera, whom he dubbed "too capitalist", and the MNS also hinted at wishing to add Spanish Galicia to Portugal, a further source of tension with the Falangist. Brigadas de choque, a form of stormtrooper organisation, were established by the MNS although rarely utilised, with street battles not really a feature of Portuguese politics at the time.
They grew rapidly in their early stages and were estimated to have 25,000 members by 1933, 5,000 more than the governing National Union. The National Syndicalists were fairly critical of the regime of António de Oliveira Salazar and the Estado Novo.

Salazar allowed the group to hold a national conference in November 1933 and indicating if they abandoned open syndicalism he would be prepared to bring them into his National Union en bloc. Whilst this proposal was not accepted by the MNS as a group many members approved, resulting in a split within the movement in early 1934, with many of those in favour of the moderate approach rewarded with positions within Salazar's government. Salazar announced the dissolution of the group on July 29, 1934, condemning the group for its defense of syndicalism.

Salazar used to call the MNS "National Communists".

Despite this official end the National Syndicalists carried on in secret and Rolão Preto helped to lead a conspiracy against the government, which also involved moderate monarchists, some members of the Portuguese Republican Party, and even a few socialists and anarchists who simply wanted to overthrow the regime. The revolt took place on September 10, 1935 but it failed to gain the support of all but a small group of soldiers on board the Bartolomeu Dias warship and in the Lisbon area of Penha de França, being crushed almost immediately. As a result of this Rolão Preto and his deputy Alberto Monsaraz were forced into exile in Spain and the National Syndicalists were fully repressed. The dissidents of the National Syndicalists were subsequently integrated in the União Nacional.

See also
National Syndicalism

References

Bibliography

Costa Pinto, Antonio. 2019. "The Portuguese “Blue Shirts” and Salazar’s “New State”" in Reactionary Nationalists, Fascists and Dictatorships in the Twentieth Century. Springer.
S. U. Larsen, B. Hagtvet & J. P. Myklebust, Who Were the Fascists: Social Roots of European Fascism, Oslo, 1980

Footnotes

Political parties established in 1932
Defunct political parties in Portugal
Far-right parties in Portugal
National syndicalism
Political parties disestablished in 1934
1932 establishments in Portugal
1934 disestablishments in Portugal
Integralismo Lusitano
Fascist parties
Anti-communist parties